Udea nordeggensis is a moth in the family Crambidae. It was described by James Halliday McDunnough in 1929. It is found in North America, where it has been recorded from Alberta.

References

nordeggensis
Moths described in 1929